Magic: The Gathering Limited Edition is the first Magic: The Gathering card set. It premiered in a limited release at Origins Game Fair in 1993, with a general release that August. The initial print run of 2.6 million cards sold out quickly, and a new printing run was released in October 1993. These two runs are known as Limited Edition Alpha and Limited Edition Beta, or just Alpha and Beta for short. Although Alpha and Beta are referred to as different sets by some, officially they are the same set; Wizards of the Coast had expected that people wouldn't necessarily be able to tell the two press runs apart. Beta fixed a number of misprints and errors on cards. The printer accidentally used different corner rounding dies for the second run, resulting in Alpha cards being noticeably distinct in shape and appearance from Beta cards and all subsequent cards. The Beta printing also included a revised rulebook with a number of clarifications, although creator Richard Garfield's short fiction "Worzel's Tale" was removed to make room. 
The print run of Beta is given as 7.3 million or 7.8 million depending on the source. Despite the set's print run being about three times as big as Alpha's, Beta sold out as quickly as its predecessor.

Limited Edition cards have no expansion symbol, no copyright date, and no trademark symbols; the text on the bottom left consists only of an artist credit.

Set history

Originally, the designers and playtesters of the new card game intended the name would simply be "Magic". However, the lawyers at Wizards of the Coast advised that the name was too generic to be trademarked, and was thus changed to "Magic: The Gathering". The original intent was that each Magic expansion would have a different subtitle; while the first Magic set would be "The Gathering", future sets could be labeled as "Magic: Arabian Nights" or "Magic: Ice Age". When it was decided that the backs of Magic should be identical regardless of the expansion, the name "Magic: The Gathering" would appear prominently on the back of every Magic card. "Magic: The Gathering" thus became the name of the entire game instead of "The Gathering" only being the subtitle referring to the first release.

As the names Alpha and Beta only distinguish different print runs of the same set, Alpha and Beta contain largely the same cards. As well as including these two extra cards, the Beta print run included a new illustration for each of the five basic lands, taking the total card count from 295 to 302. According to Mark Rosewater, this was done so that the product could be advertised as having "over 300 cards". Several mistakes on Alpha cards were corrected in Beta. Alpha cards are easily distinguishable from Beta cards as unlike all succeeding sets, cards from Alpha have steeply rounded corners. This was reportedly caused by sharpening of the dies used to cut the Beta cards, which resulted in the less rounded corners. The Wizards of the Coast tournament rules require that a deck including Alpha cards have opaque card sleeves to prevent a player from being able to identify the difference between an Alpha and a non-Alpha card in their library, as the corners are different from all the printings that followed.

Alpha, Beta, and Unlimited are known for having extremely powerful cards at the higher rarities. This was an intentional choice during development; the thought was that "players (...) wouldn't be able to acquire many of the power rares, because supply would keep them actually rare". Players spending hundreds of dollars to acquire multiple copies of each of the powerful rares was not anticipated at the time, as the developers assumed players would stop at around 30-50 dollars.

The Alpha rulebook contains a fantasy tale called "Worzel's Story" by Richard Garfield which was removed for the Beta release. Alpha deck boxes also lack a UPC on the bottom.

Mechanics

Being the first Magic set, Limited Edition has all of the original mechanics intrinsic to Magic, such as "tapping" cards to use their abilities. Many of the original base keywords are "evergreen" and still used commonly in Magic design as of 2019, such as Flying, First Strike, and Trample. A few keywords have since been phased out of the game. The Banding ability was discontinued in the set Tempest, released in 1997. According to the Wizards of the Coast designers, the Banding mechanic confused players and required too much text to explain. When old mechanics were revisited in the Time Spiral block, banding was left out for this same reason. Much later, regeneration and "landwalk" (e.g. Forestwalk, Swampwalk) were discontinued. Landwalk was removed in 2015 with the release of Magic Origins, and no more Regeneration cards have been created starting with the Shadows over Innistrad block in 2016.

Many Limited Edition cards had abilities that have since become keyword abilities. The ability "may only be blocked by black or artifact creatures" was recast as the keyword Fear in 8th Edition which was replaced by Intimidate with the release of Zendikar. A rule in Limited Edition that prevented Walls from attacking was removed in 9th Edition and all walls were given the new keyword "Defender", which prevents them from attacking. 's ability "doesn't tap to attack" was recast as the keyword Vigilance in Champions of Kamigawa. "May attack the turn it comes into play" has changed twice; it was first changed to "unaffected by summoning sickness" in Mirage and then replaced with the keyword Haste in Urza's Destiny.

The rules of Limited Edition included a provision for ante. Games would be started by each player removing a card at random from their deck. The winner of the game took both cards. This aspect of the game continued until the Homelands set in 1995, but was dropped as the cards became collectible and valuable and the company did not want to be associated with gambling.

Limited Edition included a number of unique cards exploring mechanics rarely seen in later sets.  is a card involving dexterity, in which the card is flipped onto the play area to determine cards destroyed by the Orb. Both manual dexterity cards such as Chaos Orb and ante cards are banned in all sanctioned Magic formats as of 2013.

Notable cards
These are widely considered the most powerful cards in Limited Edition, and are among the most powerful in all of Magic: The Gathering. All of these cards are now restricted in tournament play; players may only include one copy of each in a deck. The color distribution of the Power Nine is heavily skewed; six of the cards are Artifacts, while the other three are Blue cards. In April 2016, an Alpha Black Lotus card graded as a 9.5 out of 10 was sold on eBay for $38,000; on February 27, 2019 a Black Lotus graded 9.5 out of 10 was sold in auction for $166,100.
These lands provide two colors of mana with the benefit of possessing two basic land types, an uncommon trait on non-basic lands. All future dual lands would be printed with restrictions. They are now a defining part of the Legacy and Vintage formats, in particular for their ability to be found by the various "fetchlands" (for example) released many years later.
This was the first and most famous cycle in Magic. All of them provided an effect in the number three. The cards defined the core ability of each color, but they proved to be disparate in power; the Blue Boon, Ancestral Recall, was considered the strongest, and was the only card in the cycle printed as a Rare. The green boon, Giant Growth, was considered an iconic card of Green and had appeared in every core set until the printing of Magic 2012.
 : The first Magic card that required manual dexterity as part of the game play. These two cards are currently banned in all sanctioned tournament formats.

Errors in Alpha
Alpha contained numerous misprints and did not adhere to close standardized wordings for similar effects seen in later sets and printings. The following cards had printing errors, most of which were fixed in the Beta release.
  was accidentally omitted from the set.
  had no casting cost, instead of a casting cost of 4.
  incorrectly credited Dan Frazier as the artist. The correct artist is Mark Poole.
  was printed with the letter B in its text box rather than the black mana symbol.
  was printed with the letter B in its text box rather than the black mana symbol.
  had its power/toughness listed as 1/2 rather than 2/1.
  was printed with the letter G in its text box rather than the green mana symbol, and the artist's name was spelled incorrectly.
  had a casting cost of 1R rather than 1RR.
  had a casting cost of 1R rather than 3R.
  was printed with the letter U in its text box rather than the blue mana symbol.
  was printed with the letter R in its text box rather than the red mana symbol.
  was printed as an instant rather than an interrupt (see ), making half of its ability unplayable under the rules of the time.
  incorrectly credited Jeff A. Menges as the artist. The correct artist is Dan Frazier.
  credited Mark Poole as the artist instead of Jesper Myrfors. This was corrected in the Beta printing.
  states that enchantments on the unsummoned card are "CARDed" instead of discarded.
  was accidentally omitted from Alpha and only appears in Beta.
The name of artist Douglas Shuler is generally misspelled as "Douglas Schuler". The mistake was not fixed until Revised Edition.

Several Alpha cards have other minor mistakes, most of them relating to the font.

References

External links
 Wizards of the Coast's official page on Alpha, Beta, and Unlimited
 Gatherer Alpha set list
 Transcription of the original Magic rulebook

Magic: The Gathering sets